USCGC Sycamore is the name of two United States Coast Guard buoy tenders:

 , commissioned in 1941, decommissioned in 1977
 , commissioned in 2002

United States Coast Guard ship names